The Macquarie parakeet (Cyanoramphus erythrotis), also known as the Macquarie Island parakeet, is an extinct parrot from subantarctic Macquarie Island, an outlying part of Tasmania, Australia, in the Southern Ocean.

Taxonomy
The Macquarie parakeet was previously considered to be a subspecies of the red-fronted parakeet C. novaezelandiae, which it resembled in appearance, but was later lumped with Reischek's parakeet from the Antipodes Islands in a 2001 paper by Wee Ming Boon and others following an examination of the molecular systematics of the genus which found that many of the red-crowned parakeet subspecies should be elevated to full species.  However, subsequently the provenance of Boon et al.’s supposed Macquarie Island material was shown to be mistaken, originating from the Antipodes Islands instead.

History
When Macquarie Island was discovered in 1810 the parrots were widespread in tussock grassland and abundant on the shoreline, feeding on invertebrates in beach-washed seaweed.  Despite the introduction of dogs and cats to the island by 1820, as well as being hunted for food by sealers, the parrots remained common there until about 1880.

The transition from abundance to extinction took little more than a decade.  The critical events leading to the extinction of the parrot were the introductions of both wekas and European rabbits to the island in the 1870s and their subsequent spread during the 1880s.  Until then winter, with the seasonal absence of burrow-nesting petrels and breeding penguins, was a period of food scarcity for terrestrial predators, which served to keep their numbers low.  The presence of rabbits provided a year-round food supply for cats and wekas and allowed their numbers to expand, leading to increased predation on the parrot, the last sighting of which was in 1891.

References

External links

Cyanoramphus
Extinct birds of Australia
Bird extinctions since 1500
Birds described in 1832
Taxa named by Johann Georg Wagler
Extinct birds of subantarctic islands
Macquarie Island
Species made extinct by human activities